Green Mosque may refer to:

 al-Khadra Mosque, Nablus, Palestinian territories
 Green Mosque, Balkh, Afghanistan
 Green Mosque, Mosul, Iraq
 Green Mosque, Kigali, Kigali, Rwanda
 Green Mosque, Bursa, Turkey
 Green Mosque, İznik, Turkey